Jean-Marie Londeix (20 September 1932) is a French saxophonist born in Libourne who studied saxophone, piano, harmony and chamber music.

Career

Jean-Marie Londeix began his saxophone study with bassoonist Jules Ferry at the Bordeaux Conservatory. He later studied with Marcel Mule at the Paris Conservatory.  He also studied with Fernand Oubradous and Norbert Dufourcq, among others. He then served as the saxophone instructor at the Conservatory of Dijon for 18 years. He retired from the Conservatoire de Bordeaux, France in 2001.

Jean-Marie Londeix won an international saxophone competition when he was 15 years old.

He is the founder of the "French Saxophonists Association" and the "International Saxophone Committee."

More than 100 varied compositions have been written specifically for him, and he has published several pedagogical works. Some famous saxophone players that have studied with him include Richard Dirlam, Perry Rask, Russell Peterson, Ryo Noda, Jan Baker, James Umble, Robert Black, Susan Fancher, Ross Ingstrup, William Street, Christian Lauba and Jack Kripl (winner of the prize for Saxophone at the International Competition for Musical Performers in Geneva Switzerland, 1970).

Teaching Career

 Selected former students:

 Marie-Bernadette Charrier
 Susan Cook
 Mark Engebretson
 Susan Fancher
 Jean-Michel Goury
 Ryō Noda

Works written for Jean-Marie Londeix
 Selected works:

Denisov, Edison: Concerto piccolo (1977); Sonate (1970) premiered at the 1970 World Saxophone Congress

Dubois, Pierre-Max: Concerto (1959), Hommage à Hoffnung (1980), Le Lièvre et la Tortue--Impromptu (1957), Pièces caractéristiques(1962)

Noda, Ryo: Don Quichotte, op. 2; Improvisation I (1972), Improvisation II (1973); Improvisation III (1974)

Robert, Lucie: Strophes (1978)

Rossé, François: Le frène égaré (1978-79). Etude en balance, Lobuk constrictor (1982), Spath (1981)

Sauguet, Henri: L'arbre (1976-80), Oraisons (1976), Sonatine bucolique (1964)

Bibliography
 "Jean-Marie Londeix :"Un dédain suicidaire"" in 88 notes pour piano solo, Jean-Pierre Thiollet, Neva Editions, 2015. p. 136-138.

References

1932 births
Living people
French classical musicians
Classical saxophonists
French saxophonists
Male saxophonists
Conservatoire de Paris alumni
People from Libourne
21st-century saxophonists
21st-century French male musicians